Sanjay Vijaykumar Gangapurwala (born on 24 May 1962) is an Indian Judge. Presently, he is Acting Chief Justice of Bombay High Court.

References 

 Indian judges
Living people
1962 births